Ashu is an Indian male given name. Notable people include:

 Ashu, American soloist
 Ashu Bedra (born 1990), Indian film producer
 Ashu Dani (born 1974), Indian cricketer
 Ashu Malik (born 1983), Indian politician
 Ashu Sharma (born 1982), Indian television actor
 Ashu Trikha (born 1969), Indian film actor

Indian masculine given names